Trogus pennator is a species of parasitoid wasp in the genus Trogus.
Trogus pennator contains the following subspecies:
 Trogus pennator argutus

References

Ichneumonidae